The manticore or mantichore (Latin: mantichōra;; Modern  ) is a Persian legendary creature similar to the Egyptian sphinx that proliferated in western European medieval art as well. It has the head of a human, the body of a lion and a tail of venomous spines similar to porcupine quills, while other depictions have it with the tail of a scorpion. There are some accounts that the spines can be shot like arrows, thus making the manticore a lethal predator.

Etymology
The term "manticore" descends via Latin mantichora from Ancient Greek  (martikhórās) This in turn is a transliteration of an Old Persian compound word consisting of martīya 'man' and xuar- stem, 'to eat' (Mod. ; mard + ; khurden).

The ultimate source of manticore was Ctesias, Greek physician of the Persian court during the Achaemenid dynasty, and is based on the testimonies of his Persian-speaking informants who had travelled to India. Ctesias himself wrote that the martichora was its name in Persian, which translated into Greek as androphagon or anthropophagon, i.e., "man-eater". But the name was mistranscribed as 'mantichoras' in a faulty copy of Aristotle, through whose works the notion of the manticore was perpetuated across Europe.

Classical literature 
 
An account of the manticore was given in Ctesias's lost book Indica ("India"), and circulated among Greek writers on natural history, but has survived only in fragments and epitomes preserved by later writers.

Photius's Myriobiblon (or Bibliotheca, 9th century) serves as base text, but Aelian  (De Natura Animalium, 3rd century) preserves the same information and more:

The beast's name means "maneater", as already noted. Aelian citing Ctesias adds that the Mantichora prefers to hunt humans, lying in wait, taking down even 2, 3 men at a time. And the Indians take their young captive, disabling its tail by crushing it with stone before the growth of sting begins.

Pliny's Aethiopian beasts 
Pliny described the "mantichora" in his Naturalis Historia  (c. 77 AD) having relied on a faulty copy of Aristotle's natural history that contained the misspelling ("martikhoras").

Pliny also introduced the confused notion that the manticore might occur in Africa, because he had discussed this and other creatures (such as the yale) within a passage on Aethiopia. But he also described the crocotta and the mantichora of Aethiopia together, and while the crocotta imitated the voices of men the mantichora of Aethiopia too also mimicked human speech, on authority of Juba II, with a voice like the pipe (panpipe, fistula) mixed with trumpet.

Legacy 
Ctesias purportedly saw a martichora presented to the Persian king by the Indians. The Romanised Greek Pausanias was skeptical and considered it an unreliable exaggerated account of a tiger.  Apollonius of Tyana also dismissed the mantichore as a tall tale, according to the biography by Philostratus (c. 170–247).

Pliny did not share Pausanias' skepticism. And for 1500 years afterwards, it was Pliny's account, also copied by Solinus (2nd century), which was held to be authoritative on matters of natural history whether real or mythological. In the advent of Christianity, writings in the Holy Scripture combined with Plinian-Aristotelian learning gave rise to the Physiologus (also c. 2nd century), which later evolved into the medieval bestiaries some of which contained entries on the manticore.

Medieval sources

Bestiaries 

The manticore has been included in some medieval bestiaries, with accompanying illustrations, though not all.

The thick-maned (and long-bearded) manticore wearing a Phrygian cap is a commonplace design (fig., top left).

In most instances, the manticora is "coloured red or brown and has clawed feet". Artists took the liberty of coloring the manticore blue at times. One example is depicted "as a long-haired blond"  (fig., top right). Another has the face of a woman and the body of a blue manticore (fig., bottom right) .

Most manuscripts do not bother detailing the scorpion tail and simply draw a long cat's tail,
but in Harley MS 3244 the manticore has an "oddly pointed tail" or an "extraordinary spike on the end" of it, and a tail covered in spikes from end to end is shown on the manticore in several other second family manuscripts

The three-rows of teeth are not faithfully represented except in some third family examples.

Manuscripts and text 

Second Family
The manticore occurs in about half of the Second Family Latin bestiaries, The specific source used in this case was probably Solinus (2nd century),

The text here describing the beast differs little from Pliny's Latin version in language, or the Greek version in content (paraphrased above). This is naturally the case, since much of Solinus was recopied out of Pliny, and the manticora is described as "bloody-colored" here rather than "red like cinnabar".

The text concludes by stating that the manticore "seeks human flesh, is active, and leaps so that neither large spaces nor broad obstacles can delay it (neither the broadest space nor the widest barrier can hinder it)".

H text
Actually there are two candidate sources given for the passage, "Solinus 52.37" and "H iii.8"; this "H" being the pseudo-Hugh of Saint Victor De bestiis et aliis rebus, edited by Migne, but this source has been regarded circumspectly as the "problematic De bestiis et aliis rebus" by Clark.

Transitional
The manticore also occurs in the earliest "Transitional" First Family bestiary (c. 1185), and some Third Family codices as well, whose illustrations attempted to reproduce some of the finer details given in its text.

Confounding with other hybrid beasts 
As aforementioned, the manticore is one of three hybrids from Aithiopia described together by Solinus, appearing in (nearly) successive chapters of the bestiary. This created the groundwork for the beasts in adjacent chapters being confounded or amalgamated through scribal errors, as described below in the cases of bestiaries produced in France.

French mistransmission 
The manticore is basically absent from the French bestiary of Pierre de Beauvais, which exist in the short versions of 38 or 39 chapters, and the long version of 71 chapters. Instead, there is a Chapter 44 on the "centicore" (or santicora, var. ceucrocata), which suggests manticore in name, but which is nothing like the standard manticore. The name is thought to have arisen from misspellings of leucrocotta, compounded by the suffix replaced by -cora by scribal error. Due to further mistransmission, "centicore" became the French misnomer for the yale (eale), a mythic antelope which should be a separate entry in the bestiaries.

Neither manticore nor leucrotta appears in Philippe de Thaun's bestiary in Anglo-Norman verse.

Heraldry 

The likeness of manticore or similar creatures by other names have been used in heraldry, spanning from the late High Middle Ages into the modern period.

The manticore  first appeared in English heraldry in c. 1470, as a badge of William Hastings, 1st Baron Hastings; and in the 16th century.

The manticore device was later used as a badge by Robert Radcliffe, 1st Earl of Sussex, and by Sir Anthony Babyngton. Radcliffe's device was described as "3 mantygers argent" by one source, c. 1600. Thus in heraldic discourse the term "manticore" became usurped by "mantyger" during the 17–18th centuries, and "mantiger" in the 19th.

It is noted that the manticore/mantiger of heraldic devices has a beast of prey body as standard, but sometimes chosen to be given dragon feet. The Radcliffe family manticore appears to have human feet, and (not so surprisingly), a chronicler described as a "Babyon" (baboon) the device by John Radcliffe (Lord Fitzwalter) accompanying Henry VIII into war in France. It has also been speculated the Babyngton device is intendented to represent the "Babyon, or baboon, as a play upon his name", and it too also has characteristically "monkey-like feet".

The typical heraldic manticore is supposed to have not only the face of an old man, but spiraling horns as well, although this is not really ascertainable in the Radcliffe family badge, where the purple manticore is wearing a yellow cap (cap of dignity ).

Renaissance period 

Edward Topsell, in 1607, described the manticore as: 

Randle Holme drew on this description in 1688, when he described the manticore (which he regarded as distinct from the mantyger) as having:

Parallels 
Gerald Brenan linked the manticore to the mantequero, a monster feeding on human fat in Andalusian folklore.

The Hindu god Narasimha is often referred to as a Manticore. Narasimha, the man lion, is the fourth avatar of Vishnu and is described as having a man’s torso and the head and claws of a lion.

In fiction 
Dante Alighieri, in his Inferno, depicted the mythical Geryon as a manticore, following Pliny's description.

Fine art 

The heraldic manticore influenced some Mannerist representations of the sin of Fraud, conceived as a monstrous chimera with a beautiful woman's face – for example, in Bronzino's allegory Venus, Cupid, Folly and Time (National Gallery, London), and more commonly in the decorative schemes called  (grotesque). From here it passed by way of Cesare Ripa's Iconologia into the seventeenth- and eighteenth-century French conception of a sphinx.

Popular culture 
In some modern depictions, such as in the tabletop role-playing game Dungeons & Dragons and the card game Magic: The Gathering, manticores are depicted as having wings.

It was claimed in a 1994 book that the manticore, with "bloodshot eyes", devours its prey whole, using its triple rows of teeth, leaving no traces of its victims (including bones) behind, This behavior pattern has been incorporated into various fictional novels which appeared after this date.

Two manticores appear in My Little Pony: Friendship is Magic. They both have a lion head, dragon wings and a scorpion tail.

A manticore is the main antagonist of the concept album Tarkus by Emerson, Lake and Palmer.

A manticore appears in the Dark Souls DLC, Artorias of the Abyss, as the name "Sanctuary Guardian".

In the Ninja Sex Party discography the Manticore is described as an antagonistic being. Initially announced by Danny Sexbang, the vocalist, with his mythical features, the Manticore appears on stage productions and music videos as a humanoid being with a mask, teeth, ears and lion hand-paws. Still, the Manticore holds up to his antagonistic nature, taking delight in stalking and bringing misfortune to Danny.

The BBC 2010 Merlin season 3 episode 9 entitled "Love in the Time of Dragons" features a CGI animated manticore.

The song "Circus Maximus" off of the 2005 album Robot Hive/Exodus by the band Clutch mentions the "unholy stench of the manticore".

One of the playable characters in the video game Smite is Martichoras, an original character with the title “The Manticore King”.

In the 1995 James Bond film, GoldenEye, the film's female antagonist Xenia Onatopp lures an unsuspecting admiral onto her yacht moored in Monte Carlo harbour, called Manticore. Onboard, she crushes him to death during sex, allowing a hidden compatriot to steal his military credentials.

Explanatory notes

References
Citations

Bibliography

 
  American edition, Clarkson N. Potter, Inc. 1976
 
 , Aelian, pp. 61–62; Pausanias, pp. 62–63
 
 ; [ Reprint], C. N. Potter, 1976
 

  Translated from the Latin (Cambridge Univ. Library MS. Ii.4.26).

External links

Mythological felines
Heraldic beasts
Mythological lions
Mythological human hybrids
Persian legendary creatures
Human-headed mythical creatures
Mythological monsters
Sphinxes